Dave "Stiff" Johnson is a record producer from Philadelphia, Pennsylvania.

Discography
G. Love & Special Sauce - Back in the Day (1993)
Dandelion - I Think I'm Gonna Be Sick (1993)
Urban Dance Squad - Persona Non Grata (1994)
Urban Dance Squad - "Demagogue" (1994)
G. Love & Special Sauce - G. Love and Special Sauce (1994)
Ashbury Faith - Adrenalin (1995)
Züri West - Hoover Jam (1996)
G. Love & Special Sauce - Yeah, It's That Easy (1997)
David Garza -  This Euphoria (1998)
Buck-O-Nine - Libido (1999)
Industrial Frost - "Repent" (2008)

References

External links
Dave "Stiff" Johnson on the Hard Rock Times
Stiff Johnson on MSN Music

Year of birth missing (living people)
Living people